Hot Country Songs is a chart that ranks the top-performing country music songs in the United States, published by Billboard magazine.  In 1991, 30 different songs topped the chart, then published under the title Hot Country Singles & Tracks, in 52 issues of the magazine, based on weekly airplay data from country music radio stations compiled by Nielsen Broadcast Data Systems.

George Strait's song "I've Come to Expect It from You" began the year at number one, having held the top position for the last four weeks of 1990.  The next week, Garth Brooks achieved the first of his eventual four number ones of the year with his song "Unanswered Prayers".  Brooks' four was the most number ones for the year by any act, though Alan Jackson and George Strait would each have three songs reach the top of the chart.  Ricky Van Shelton reached number one twice as a solo performer, and once in collaboration with Dolly Parton on her song "Rockin' Years".  Three songs spent three weeks each at the top of the chart, the most of any song for the year:  "Down Home" by Alabama, "Don't Rock the Jukebox" by Alan Jackson, and "You Know Me Better Than That" by George Strait.

Several acts hit number one with their debut singles during the year. Diamond Rio hit number one in June with the band's debut single "Meet in the Middle".  Trisha Yearwood accomplished the  same feat in August with her debut single "She's in Love with the Boy"  Brooks & Dunn's debut single as a duo, "Brand New Man", topped the charts in September, although both had previously released songs as solo performers.  Lionel Cartwright charted the only number one of his career with "Leap of Faith" in the September 21 issue of Billboard. Yearwood and Parton were two of three women to reach the top of the chart in 1991, Reba McEntire being the other one. The year-ending number one was "My Next Broken Heart" by Brooks & Dunn.

Chart history

See also
1991 in music
List of artists who reached number one on the U.S. country chart

References

1991
1991 record charts
Country